The canton of Saint-Trivier-de-Courtes is a former administrative division in eastern France. It was disbanded following the French canton reorganisation which came into effect in March 2015. It had 6,322 inhabitants (2012).

The canton comprised 12 communes:

Cormoz
Courtes
Curciat-Dongalon
Lescheroux
Mantenay-Montlin
Saint-Jean-sur-Reyssouze
Saint-Julien-sur-Reyssouze
Saint-Nizier-le-Bouchoux
Saint-Trivier-de-Courtes
Servignat
Vernoux
Vescours

Demographics

See also
Cantons of the Ain department

References

Former cantons of Ain
2015 disestablishments in France
States and territories disestablished in 2015